Ansonville is a town in Anson County, North Carolina, United States. The population was 421 at the 2020 census.

Geography

Demographics

As of the census of 2000, there were 636 people, 242 households, and 172 families residing in the town. The population density was 435.2 people per square mile (168.2/km2). There were 262 housing units at an average density of 179.3 per square mile (69.3/km2). The racial makeup of the town was 22.48% White, 76.42% African American, 0.47% Asian, and 0.63% from two or more races. Hispanic or Latino of any race were 0.31% of the population.

There were 242 households, out of which 28.1% had children under the age of 18 living with them, 44.2% were married couples living together, 22.7% had a female householder with no husband present, and 28.9% were non-families. 28.5% of all households were made up of individuals, and 11.6% had someone living alone who was 65 years of age or older. The average household size was 2.63 and the average family size was 3.24.

In the town, the population was spread out, with 24.2% under the age of 18, 8.8% from 18 to 24, 26.7% from 25 to 44, 24.2% from 45 to 64, and 16.0% who were 65 years of age or older. The median age was 40 years. For every 100 females, there were 85.4 males. For every 100 females age 18 and over, there were 81.9 males.

The median income for a household in the town was $26,576, and the median income for a family was $30,982. Males had a median income of $24,231 versus $17,708 for females. The per capita income for the town was $12,754. About 9.7% of families and 10.7% of the population were below the poverty line, including 11.9% of those under age 18 and 7.9% of those age 65 or over.

References

Towns in North Carolina
Towns in Anson County, North Carolina
Populated places established in 1844